Rosenthaler Platz is a Berlin U-Bahn station located on the .
Opened in 1930, the station was designed by Alfred Grenander, making prominent use of orange uranium tiles.

From 1961 to 1989 the station was one of the city's many "ghost stations". The station served as a temporary border crossing after the fall of the Berlin Wall.

References

U8 (Berlin U-Bahn) stations
Buildings and structures in Mitte
Berlin border crossings
Railway stations in Germany opened in 1930